Stop!! Hibari-kun! is a 35-episode Japanese anime television series based on the manga series of the same name written and illustrated by Hisashi Eguchi. It is directed by Takashi Hisaoka and produced by the animation studio Toei Animation. The screenplay was written by: Shigeru Yanagawa, Tokio Tsuchiya, Hiroshi Toda, Tomomi Tsutsui, Takeshi Shudo and Yumi Asano. The character design used in the anime was provided by Yoshinori Kanemori, and the music was composed by Kōji Nishimura. The series follows Kōsaku Sakamoto, a high school student who goes to live with yakuza boss Ibari Ōzora and his four children—Tsugumi, Tsubame, Hibari and Suzume—after the death of his mother. Kōsaku is shocked to learn that Hibari, who looks and behaves as a girl, was assigned male at birth.

The series aired from May 20, 1983 to January 27, 1984 on Fuji Television. The series was later released by Universal J to two DVD compilation volumes from February to March 2003. A DVD box set was released by TC Entertainment in September 2014. The opening theme is  sung by Yuki Yukino and the ending theme is  sung by Ai Hoshino.


Episode list

References

Lists of anime episodes